Welcome 2 Cashville is the second mixtape released by Young Buck featuring new music from the label's The Outlawz, Tha City Paper, Rukus 100, Sosa Tha Plug & Paperchase. The mixtape features exclusive tracks and freestyles from Ca$hville Records. Other Nashville, Ten-A-Keyans that appear on this project include CTN, Charlie P, Bezzled Gang, Frank Wyte & more. It was released for digital download and sale on iTunes on December 25, 2012. One Ca$hville Records artist that didn't make it on the mixtape due to being in prison was westcoast rapper C-Bo.

Track list

References

External links 
 
 
 
 
 
 
 
 
 
 
 

2012 mixtape albums